William Henry Grigsby (born March 19, 1970) is an American former professional boxer who competed from 1988 to 2007 and held the IBF junior flyweight title twice between 1998 and 2006. He also won the WBO junior flyweight title in 2000, but was stripped of the title for failing a drug test.

Professional career 
Grigsby turned pro in 1988 and lost his second professional fight, to flyweight legend Michael Carbajal who was making his professional debut. In 1998 he captured the vacant IBF light flyweight title by decisioning Ratanapol Sor Vorapin. He defended the belt once before losing it to Ricardo Lopez in 1999. In 2000 he captured the WBO light flyweight title with a decision win over Nelson Dieppa, but was stripped of the belt after the fight for testing positive for marijuana. The fight changed to no decision. He fought sporadically before capturing the IBF light flyweight title with a decision over Victor Burgos in 2005. He lost the belt in his first defense to Ulises Solís, and lost a rematch with Solís in 2007.

Professional boxing record

{|class="wikitable" style="text-align:center; font-size:95%"
|-
!
!Result
!Record
!Opponent
!Type
!Round, time
!Date
!Location
!Notes
|-
|24
|Loss
|18–4–1 (1)
|style="text-align:left;"| Ulises Solís
|
|8 (12), 
|Jan 25, 2007
|style="text-align:left;"| 
|style="text-align:left;"|
|-
|23
|Loss
|18–3–1 (1)
|style="text-align:left;"| Ulises Solís
|UD
|12
|Jan 7, 2006
|style="text-align:left;"| 
|style="text-align:left;"|
|-
|22
|Win
|18–2–1 (1)
|style="text-align:left;"| Víctor Burgos
|UD
|12
|May 14, 2005
|style="text-align:left;"| 
|style="text-align:left;"|
|-
|21
|Win
|17–2–1 (1)
|style="text-align:left;"| Ruben Contreras
|UD
|8
|Jan 28, 2005
|style="text-align:left;"| 
|
|-
|20
|Win
|16–2–1 (1)
|style="text-align:left;"| Ruben Poma
|TKO
|1 (8), 
|Nov 27, 2004
|style="text-align:left;"| 
|
|-
|19
|Win
|15–2–1 (1)
|style="text-align:left;"| Kenny Berrios
|UD
|8
|Jun 28, 2002
|style="text-align:left;"| 
|
|-
|18
|style="background:#DDD"| 
|14–2–1 (1)
|style="text-align:left;"| Nelson Dieppa
|UD
|12
|Jul 22, 2000
|style="text-align:left;"| 
|style="text-align:left;"|
|-
|17
|Loss
|14–2–1
|style="text-align:left;"| Ricardo López
|UD
|12
|Oct 2, 1999
|style="text-align:left;"| 
|style="text-align:left;"|
|-
|16
|Win
|14–1–1
|style="text-align:left;"| Carmelo Caceres
|UD
|12
|Mar 6, 1999
|style="text-align:left;"| 
|style="text-align:left;"|
|-
|15
|Win
|13–1–1
|style="text-align:left;"| Ratanapol Sor Vorapin
|UD
|12
|Dec 18, 1998
|style="text-align:left;"| 
|style="text-align:left;"|
|-
|14
|Draw
|12–1–1
|style="text-align:left;"| Fernando Ibarra
|
|1 (8), 
|Nov 13, 1998
|style="text-align:left;"| 
|
|-
|13
|Win
|12–1
|style="text-align:left;"| Javier Cintron
|UD
|12
|Feb 13, 1998
|style="text-align:left;"| 
|style="text-align:left;"|
|-
|12
|Win
|11–1
|style="text-align:left;"| Jesus Lopez
|UD
|8
|Oct 4, 1997
|style="text-align:left;"| 
|
|-
|11
|Win
|10–1
|style="text-align:left;"| Jose Luis De Jesus
|
|4 (4)
|May 10, 1997
|style="text-align:left;"| 
|
|-
|10
|Win
|9–1
|style="text-align:left;"| Jesus Lopez
|
|12
|Oct 10, 1996
|style="text-align:left;"| 
|style="text-align:left;"|
|-
|9
|Win
|8–1
|style="text-align:left;"| Roberto Romero
|UD
|6
|Apr 20, 1996
|style="text-align:left;"| 
|
|-
|8
|Win
|7–1
|style="text-align:left;"| Eduardo Manzano
|TKO
|7 (8)
|Mar 2, 1996
|style="text-align:left;"| 
|
|-
|7
|Win
|6–1
|style="text-align:left;"| Jesus Garcia
|TKO
|4 (6)
|Jul 14, 1995
|style="text-align:left;"| 
|
|-
|6
|Win
|5–1
|style="text-align:left;"| Juan Camero
|TKO
|3 (6)
|Jun 10, 1995
|style="text-align:left;"| 
|
|-
|5
|Win
|4–1
|style="text-align:left;"| Orlando Malone
|UD
|6
|Mar 17, 1995
|style="text-align:left;"| 
|
|-
|4
|Win
|3–1
|style="text-align:left;"| Miguel Montoya
|KO
|3 (4)
|Mar 7, 1995
|style="text-align:left;"| 
|
|-
|3
|Win
|2–1
|style="text-align:left;"| Dallas Hawkins
|
|1 (4)
|Sep 30, 1994
|style="text-align:left;"| 
|
|-
|2
|Loss
|1–1
|style="text-align:left;"| Michael Carbajal
|
|4
|Feb 24, 1989
|style="text-align:left;"| 
|
|-
|1
|Win
|1–0
|style="text-align:left;"| Ed Meeks
|
|3 (4)
|Nov 23, 1988
|style="text-align:left;"| 
|

References

External links 
 

1970 births
International Boxing Federation champions
Light-flyweight boxers
Living people
World light-flyweight boxing champions
World boxing champions
Boxers from Saint Paul, Minnesota
American male boxers